Newtown is an electoral district of the Legislative Assembly in the Australian state of New South Wales. It includes the inner Sydney suburbs of Redfern, Chippendale, Darlington, Eveleigh, Newtown, Enmore, Stanmore and Petersham and parts of Surry Hills, Waterloo, Erskineville, Camperdown, Marrickville and Lewisham.

History
Newtown was originally created in 1859, and named after and including Newtown. It elected one member from 1859 to 1880, two members from 1880 to 1885, three members from 1885 to 1891 and four members from 1891 to 1894. With the abolition of multi-member constituencies in 1894, it was replaced by Newtown-Camperdown, Newtown-Erskine, Newtown-St Peters and Marrickville.

Newtown was re-created in 1904 as a result of the 1903 New South Wales referendum, which required the number of members of the Legislative Assembly to be reduced from 125 to 90 which saw the districts of Newtown-Camperdown, Newtown-Erskine and Newtown-St Peters abolished and replaced by Newtown and Camperdown.

In 1920, with the introduction of proportional representation, it was absorbed into Botany. Newtown was recreated in 1927 and combined with part of Annandale and renamed Newtown-Annandale in 1950.

Newtown was recreated at the 2013 redistribution, partly replacing Marrickville.

Members for Newtown

Election results

References

External links

Newtown
1859 establishments in Australia
Newtown
1894 disestablishments in Australia
Newtown
1904 establishments in Australia
Newtown
1920 disestablishments in Australia
Newtown
1950 disestablishments in Australia
Newtown
2015 establishments in Australia
Newtown